1337 Gerarda, provisional designation , is a dark background asteroid from the outer regions of the asteroid belt, approximately 40 kilometers in diameter. It was discovered on 9 September 1934, by Dutch astronomer Hendrik van Gent at the Union Observatory in Johannesburg, South Africa. The asteroid was named after Gerarda Prins, the wife of an orbit computer at Leiden Observatory.

Orbit and classification 

Gerarda is a non-family asteroid from the main belt's background population. It orbits the Sun in the outer main-belt at a distance of 2.6–3.2 AU once every 4 years and 12 months (1,814 days; semi-major axis of 2.91 AU). Its orbit has an eccentricity of 0.10 and an inclination of 18° with respect to the ecliptic.

The body's observation arc begins with its official discovery observation at Johannesburg.

Physical characteristics 

Gerarda has been characterized as a dark and primitive P-type asteroid by the Wide-field Infrared Survey Explorer (WISE). It has also been classified as an X-type asteroid by Pan-STARRS photometric survey, while the Collaborative Asteroid Lightcurve Link (CALL) assumes it to be a carbonaceous C-type asteroid.

Rotation period 

In November 1984, a first rotational lightcurve of Gerarda was obtained from photometric observations by American astronomer Richard Binzel. Lightcurve analysis gave a rotation period of 12.52 hours with a brightness variation of 0.23 magnitude. A similar period of 12.462 with an identical amplitude of 0.23 was measured by astronomers at the Palomar Transient Factory in June 2012.

Diameter and albedo 

According to the surveys carried out by the Infrared Astronomical Satellite IRAS, the Japanese Akari satellite and the NEOWISE mission of NASA's WISE telescope, Gerarda measures between 35.56 and 46.464 kilometers in diameter and its surface has an albedo between 0.0297 and 0.0441.

CALL derives an albedo of 0.0425 and a diameter of 38.84 kilometers based on an absolute magnitude of 11.10.

Naming 

This minor planet was named by Dutch astronomer Gerrit Pels, who computed this asteroid's orbit. It was named after Gerarda Prins, the wife of G. Prins, an orbit computer at Leiden Observatory. The author of the Dictionary of Minor Planet Names, Lutz Schmadel, learned about the naming circumstances from Ingrid van Houten-Groeneveld, who was herself a long-time staff member at the Leiden Observatory.

References

External links 
 Asteroid Lightcurve Database (LCDB), query form (info )
 Dictionary of Minor Planet Names, Google books
 Asteroids and comets rotation curves, CdR – Observatoire de Genève, Raoul Behrend
 Discovery Circumstances: Numbered Minor Planets (1)-(5000) – Minor Planet Center
 
 

001337
Discoveries by Hendrik van Gent
Named minor planets
19340909